Sinervä is a rather small lake in Central Finland, in Multia municipality. It belongs to Kokemäenjoki main catchment area.

See also
List of lakes in Finland

References

Landforms of Central Finland
Kokemäenjoki basin
Lakes of Multia